Laura Katherine Delany (born 23 December 1992) is an Irish cricketer who currently captains Typhoons and Ireland. She is a right-handed batter and right-arm medium pace bowler. Delany made her debut for Ireland in a Women's One-Day International (WODI) against New Zealand at Kibworth Cricket Club New Ground in July 2010. In July 2021, during Ireland's home series against the Netherlands, Delany broke the captaincy record for her team, leading them for the 63rd time, passing Isobel Joyce's record of 62 matches as captain.

In November 2021, Delany was named the ICC Player of the Month.

Biography
In April 2016, she was named as captain of Ireland replacing Isobel Joyce who stepped down after the 2016 ICC Women's World Twenty20 in India. In May 2017, she played in her 100th international match, when Ireland played South Africa in the 2017 South Africa Quadrangular Series.

In June 2018, she was named as captain of Ireland for the 2018 ICC Women's World Twenty20 Qualifier tournament. In October 2018, she was named as captain of Ireland's squad for the 2018 ICC Women's World Twenty20 tournament in the West Indies. The following month, she was named the Women's International Player of the Year at the annual Cricket Ireland Awards.

In August 2019, she was named as the captain of Ireland's squad for the 2019 ICC Women's World Twenty20 Qualifier tournament in Scotland. In July 2020, she was awarded a part-time professional contract by Cricket Ireland for the following year.

In the Women's Super Series, she played for Dragons in 2015 and 2016, and captained them in 2016. She joined Typhoons in 2017, and has captained them ever since, including to their first title in 2020.

In November 2021, she was named as the captain of Ireland's team for the 2021 Women's Cricket World Cup Qualifier tournament in Zimbabwe.

References

External links

1992 births
Living people
Cricketers from Dublin (city)
Irish women cricketers
Ireland women One Day International cricketers
Ireland women Twenty20 International cricketers
Irish women cricket captains
Dragons (women's cricket) cricketers
Typhoons (women's cricket) cricketers